A school period is a block of time allocated for lessons/classes in schools and colleges. They typically last between 30 and 120 minutes, with around 3-10 periods per school day. However, especially in higher education, there can be many more. Educators determine the number and length of these periods, and may even regulate how each period will be used. One common example of this practice is to designate at least one compulsory period a day for physical education. A school bell is often used to indicate when a period begins and ends.

References

School terminology
Educational facilities
Curricula
Educational time organization